In mathematics (linear algebra), the Faddeev–LeVerrier algorithm is a recursive method to calculate the coefficients of the  characteristic polynomial  of a  square matrix, named after  Dmitry Konstantinovich Faddeev and Urbain Le Verrier. Computing determinant from the definition of characteristic polynomial, however, is computationally cumbersome,
because  is new symbolic quantity, whereas this algorithm works directly with coefficients of matrix .

The algorithm has been independently rediscovered several times, in some form or another. It was first published in 1840 by  Urbain Le Verrier, subsequently redeveloped by P. Horst, Jean-Marie Souriau, in its present form here by Faddeev and Sominsky, and further by  J. S. Frame, and others. (For historical points, see Householder.  An elegant shortcut to the proof, bypassing Newton polynomials, was introduced by Hou. The bulk of the presentation here follows Gantmacher, p. 88.)

The Algorithm
The objective is to calculate the coefficients  of the characteristic polynomial of the  matrix ,

where, evidently,   = 1 and  0 = (−1)n det .

The coefficients are determined recursively from the top down, by dint of the sequence of auxiliary matrices , 

Thus, 

etc.,
   ...; 

Derivation
The proof  relies on the modes of the adjugate matrix, the auxiliary matrices encountered.    
This matrix is defined by 
 
and is thus proportional to the resolvent 

Thus,

where one may define the harmless ≡0.

Inserting the explicit polynomial forms into the defining equation for the adjugate, above, 

 
so that shifting the dummy indices of the first term yields 

which thus dictates the recursion

for =1,...,.

This can be easiest achieved through the following auxiliary equation (Hou, 1998),
 

Inserting the polynomial mode forms in this auxiliary equation yields

so that 

and finally 

Further note in the algorithm that, more directly, 

and, in comportance with the Cayley–Hamilton theorem,

The final solution might be more conveniently expressed in terms of complete exponential Bell polynomials as

Example

.

An equivalent but distinct expression
A compact determinant of an ×-matrix solution for the above Jacobi's formula may alternatively determine the coefficients ,

See also 

 Characteristic polynomial
 Exterior algebra § Leverrier's algorithm
 Horner's method
 Fredholm determinant

References

Barbaresco F. (2019) Souriau Exponential Map Algorithm for Machine Learning on Matrix Lie Groups. In: Nielsen F., Barbaresco F. (eds) Geometric Science of Information. GSI 2019. Lecture Notes in Computer Science, vol 11712. Springer, Cham. https://doi.org/10.1007/978-3-030-26980-7_10

Polynomials
Matrix theory
Linear algebra
Mathematical physics
Determinants
Homogeneous polynomials